Podelmis quadriplagiata, is a species of riffle beetle found in Sri Lanka.

Adult beetles are found under stone, on stone in the cascade, and on stone in the current in mountainous rivers.

References 

Elmidae
Insects of Sri Lanka
Insects described in 1860